is a Japanese judoka.

He won a gold medal at the 2019 World Judo Championships.

References

External links
 
 

1993 births
Living people
Japanese male judoka
World judo champions
Judoka at the 2018 Asian Games
Asian Games silver medalists for Japan
Asian Games medalists in judo
Medalists at the 2018 Asian Games
Sportspeople from Miyazaki Prefecture
21st-century Japanese people